The following is a list of notable events and releases of the year 1991 in Norwegian music.

Events

March
 22 – The 18th Vossajazz started in Voss, Norway (March 22 – 24).

May
 22 – The 19th Nattjazz started in Bergen, Norway (May 22 – June 2).

June
 28 – The 22nd Kalvøyafestivalen started at Kalvøya near by Oslo (June 28 – 29).

Albums released

Unknown date

B
 Jon Balke
 On And On (Odin Records)with Per Jørgensen and Audun Kleive

G
 Jan Garbarek
 StAR (ECM Records), with Miroslav Vitous and Peter Erskine

K
 Bjørn Howard Kruse
 Service For The Nervois (Hot Club Records), with Warren Carlstrom and Celio de Carvalho

Deaths

 January
 29 – Ingebrigt Davik, teacher, children's writer, broadcasting personality, singer and songwriter (born 1925).

 April
 1 – Bjarne Nerem, jazz saxophonist (born 1923).

 June
 27 – Øistein "Tinka" Ringstad, jazz pianist and vibrafonist (born 1927).

 July
 7 – Jan Wølner, classical pianist (born 1909).
 31 – Magne Elvestrand, pianist and harpsichordist, best known as an organist (born 1914).

 October
 17 – Kurt Foss, composer, singer and vaudeville artist (born 1925).
 18 – Gunnar Sønstevold, composer (born 1912).

Births

 February
 4 – Kjetil Mulelid, jazz pianist and composer.
 26 – Emil Solli-Tangen, operatic singer.

 April
 10 – Andreas Skår Winther, jazz drummer.

 September
 11 – Kygo, DJ, record producer, songwriter, and pianist.

 October
 20 – Henrik Lødøen, jazz drummer.

 Unknown date
 Bendik Baksaas, Norwegian electronica artist.
 Monica Heldal, singer, songwriter, and guitarist.

See also
 1991 in Norway
 Music of Norway
 Norway in the Eurovision Song Contest 1991

References

 
Norwegian music
Norwegian
Music
1990s in Norwegian music